Estero de San Antonio is a stream in the northern California counties of Marin and Sonoma which empties into Bodega Bay.

Course
The Estero springs just north of the Marin-Sonoma county line (from a hill overlooking Bloomfield, California) and runs south along Gericke Road into Marin County. Just north of Fallon-Two Rock Road, it turns west, flowing under the road just east of State Route 1.

Ecology
The Estero de San Antonio has a variety of habitat types, including freshwater ponds, mudflats, eelgrass and saltgrass area, and wooded ravines. It is estimated that the Estero has  of associated wetlands.

In the summer or early fall, a sandbar often forms at the mouth of the Estero, damming it until the winter rains arrive. Area residents used to blast the sandbar to dispel high salt concentrations in the Estero.

Nomenclature
In particular, the Estero's watershed is often referred to as the Stemple Creek watershed. The stream is also referred to as Fallon Creek.

Bridges
The Estero de San Antonio is crossed by three concrete continuous slab bridges:
It is also crossed at Fallon-Two Rock Road by a  concrete tee beam bridge built in 1932.

See also
 Estero Americano
 List of watercourses in the San Francisco Bay Area
 San Antonio Creek (Marin County, California)

References

Rivers of Marin County, California
Rivers of Sonoma County, California
West Marin
Wetlands of the San Francisco Bay Area
Rivers of Northern California